Staircase is a 1969 British comedy-drama film adaptation of a two-character play, also called Staircase, by Charles Dyer.

The film, like the play, is about an ageing gay couple who own a barber shop in the East End of London.  They discuss their loving but often volatile past together and ponder their possible future without each other, as Charles is about to go on trial for dressing as a woman in public.

The two main characters are named Charles Dyer (the name of the playwright/screenwriter) and Harry C. Leeds, which is an anagram of his name.

Plot

Cast
 Richard Burton as Harry C. Leeds
 Rex Harrison as Charles Dyer
 Cathleen Nesbitt as Harry's mother
 Beatrix Lehmann as Charles' mother
 Avril Angers as Miss Ricard
 Pat Heywood as Nurse
 Stephen Lewis as Jack
 Gwen Nelson as Matron
 Neil Wilson as Policeman
 Shelagh Fraser as Cub mistress
 Dermot Kelly as Gravedigger
 Jake Kavanagh as Choirboy
 Gordon Heath as Postman
 Michael Rogers as drag singer during opening song
 Royston Starr as drag singer during opening song

Production
The screenplay was written by Dyer, and the film was directed by Stanley Donen. Dyer "opened up" the script to show the couple's neighbourhood, expanded the action to cover a period of ten days, and added characters. Rex Harrison and Richard Burton portrayed the couple and Cathleen Nesbitt and Beatrix Lehmann were featured as their mothers.

The film was produced by 20th Century Fox.

Because of Great Britain's tax laws, the stars insisted that the film be shot in Paris, which added to the film's budget, already inflated by their salaries ($1 million for Harrison, $1.25 million for Burton). Reportedly Elizabeth Taylor was shooting 1970's The Only Game in Town at the same time as this film was in production. While that film is set in Las Vegas, Taylor demanded that director George Stevens shoot in France so she could be close to her husband. This caused the budget of The Only Game in Town to grow higher than most large-scale, high-profile films that Fox was producing at the time.

The film's score was composed by musician/comedian Dudley Moore.

Release
Instead of marketing it as the comedy drama it was, the studio treated it like a camp comedy.

Critical
Vincent Canby of The New York Times wrote "Although Burton and Harrison are interesting actors whose styles command attention even when the material does not, 'Staircase' is essentially a stunt movie ... Unlike Harry and Charlie, who eventually come to edgy terms with the emptiness of their lives, I couldn't quite come to terms with the emptiness of the movie." Variety wrote that "Harrison and Burton have dared risky roles and have triumphed," but noted that the film "comes uncomfortably close to being depressing." Roger Ebert gave the film 1 star out 4, calling it "an unpleasant exercise in bad taste...[Donen] gives us no warmth, humor or even the dregs of understanding. He exploits the improbable team of Rex Harrison and Richard Burton as a sideshow attraction." Gene Siskel of the Chicago Tribune gave it 3 stars out of 4, calling it "a satisfactory film achievement with a very good story. Richard Burton is marvelous in holding up Staircase. Rex Harrison is more of a broken step...[he] swishes and preens too much but controls the part as the movie progresses." Charles Champlin of the Los Angeles Times wrote "We cannot will ourselves to forget that these are Harrison and Burton playing at being homosexuals. These are performances and even if they are good (as they are) and for the most part quite restrained (as they are), we still look at the craft and not into the tortured soul." Gary Arnold of The Washington Post wrote "Artistically, the depressing thing about 'Staircase' is that it has no surprises. We see everything coming a few beats or lines or minutes before the filmmakers and the stars, deliberately planting the clues and laying the groundwork and working up the old momentum, finally throw their best punches." Penelope Gilliatt of The New Yorker wrote "Written by someone else and directed by a man more fond, it could have been a love story, and it could have been wonderful. Instead of that, it comes out like some total-immersion course in Camp banter, conceived in a way that keeps signalling the heroes' freakishness. The lack of affection for them makes the film depressing ... Only Burton's acting runs deep and true and comic." Nigel Andrews of The Monthly Film Bulletin wrote "It is the air of unreality over the film that makes it finally so unsatisfying—the desultory studio street, the barber's shop permanently empty of customers, the sheer improbability of some of the acting (notably Beatrix Lehmann's grotesque cameo as Charlie's mother). If one were charitable, one could regard the whole thing as a vehicle, an opportunity for Harrison and Burton to show their paces in extravagant character roles ... Neither, however, can quite save the film from its inflated production values and the feeling that it has been cleaned up a little for popular consumption."

Rarely seen on television, the film was broadcast by Turner Classic Movies during a tribute to gay cinema in June 2007 and as a "counter culture film" in June 2019.

Box office
According to Fox records, the film required $10,675,000 in rentals to break even, and by 11 December 1970, had made $2,125,000. In September 1970, the studio reported a loss of $5,201,000 on the film.

References

External links 
 
 

1969 comedy-drama films
1969 LGBT-related films
1969 films
British LGBT-related films
British films based on plays
American LGBT-related films
20th Century Fox films
Films directed by Stanley Donen
1960s English-language films
1960s American films
1960s British films